The  is a Bo-Bo wheel arrangement DC electric locomotive type operated by the private railway operator Chichibu Railway in Saitama Prefecture, Japan, since 1963.

, one (DeKi 201) out of the original three locomotives is in operation. The locomotive is painted in a brown livery with gold lining, and is primarily used as an assisting locomotive on steam-hauled SL Paleo Express services and on empty stock movements.

History
Three locomotives, DeKi 201 to 203, were built in 1963 to provide additional capacity hauling limestone trains on the Chichibu Main Line. The design was broadly based on the earlier Class DeKi 100 locomotives, with four 230 kW traction motors instead of the earlier 200 kW motors.

Fleet details

Resale

In July 2000, two Class DeKi 200 locomotives, DeKi 202 and 203 were sold to the Sangi Railway in Mie Prefecture, where they were used to haul trains of landfill during construction of the Chūbu Centrair International Airport. The lack of ATS equipment meant that the locomotives could not run on the main line, and were finally withdrawn in March 2011.

References

Chichibu Railway
Electric locomotives of Japan
Bo-Bo locomotives
Hitachi locomotives
1067 mm gauge locomotives of Japan
1500 V DC locomotives
Railway locomotives introduced in 1963